Mariami Janikashvili (5 June 2000  is a Georgian footballer, who plays as a forward for Sivasspor in the Turkish Women's Super league, and was a member of the Georgia women's national team.

Club career
By December 2021, Janikashvili moved to Turkey and joined the newly established Turkish Super League club Sivasspor.

International career
Janikashvili was a member of the Georgia U17, Georgia U19 and the Georgia national teams.

References

2000 births
Living people
Women's footballers from Georgia (country)
Women's association football forwards
Georgia (country) women's international footballers
Expatriate women's footballers from Georgia (country)
Expatriate women's footballers in Turkey
Sivasspor (women's football) players
Turkish Women's Football Super League players
Expatriate sportspeople from Georgia (country) in Turkey